Maximianus or Maximian may refer to the following people:

Marcus Valerius Maximianus, suffect consul in 186, legionary legate during the Marcomannic Wars
Maximian (Marcus Aurelius Valerius Maximianus Herculius), co-emperor with Diocletian, 286–305
Galerius Maximianus, Roman emperor, 305–311
Magnus Maximus, or Maximianus (c. 335–388), usurping ruler of the Western Roman Empire
 Maximian (bishop of Carthage) (late 4th century), an adherent of the Donatist sect of Christianity
Archbishop Maximianus of Constantinople, archbishop 431–434
Maximianus of Ravenna (499–556), bishop of Ravenna
Maximianus (poet), sixth-century Latin poet

See also
Maximin (disambiguation)
Maximilian, a male given name